The Valley Heights train collision was an accident on the Western Railway line of New South Wales at Valley Heights.

Overview 

The collision was between a moving empty wheat train and the previous empty coal train which was stationary in Valley Heights station.  The collision took place in the early hours around 2am.

The accident occurred on July 18, 1982.

There was a risk of explosion from the leakage of gas from two cylinders in the guards van.

Fatalities and injuries 

The driver of the wheat train was killed.

The guard of the coal train was slightly injured, even though the brake van in which he was travelling was reduced to splinters.

See also 

 Wrong-side failure - this occurred with another accident.

External links 
 TV News

References 

1982 in Australia
July 1982 events in Australia
Train collisions in Australia
1980s in New South Wales
Railway accidents and incidents in New South Wales
Railway accidents in 1982
Valley Heights, New South Wales